Puiu Hașotti (born 14 June 1953) is a social conservative Romanian politician of Aromanian descent. He is a vice-president of the National Liberal Party (PNL) and the leader of the party's group in the Senate.

In April 2013, Hașotti incited controversy by declaring that he considers gay people to be "sick people". He also said that, "Homosexuality is not a normal state, it is not a natural relationship". The comments were made in the context of political debate about same-sex civil unions in Romania. Accept, Romania's national LGBT rights organisation, stated that they believed Hașotti's comments were a breach of anti-discrimination law and would report him to the National Council for Combating Discrimination.

Early life and education 

Puiu Hașotti was born on 14 June 1953 in Constanța, Romania. He is an Aromanian. Hașotti graduated from the Faculty of History, University of Bucharest in 1976 and received his doctorate in historical sciences in 1995. The year before he was a Fulbright Fellow at San Francisco State University. Before entering politics, Hașotti worked as a curator, principal curator, and then senior researcher (between 1976–1996). He also was a counsellor at Constanța County Inspectorate for Culture (1990–1995), and a lecturer at the University Ovidius Constanța, Faculty of History (1990–1996). He later gained an associate professorship at this institution, which he still holds.

References 

 Puiu Hașotti's page at the Senate of Romania
 Puiu Hașotti PNL about reglementing civil partnership between same sex -homosexuals are just some sick people, homosexuality is not a normal state.
 Biography

National Liberal Party (Romania) politicians
Members of the Senate of Romania
Romanian Ministers of Culture
1953 births
Living people
People from Constanța
Aromanian people
Romanian people of Aromanian descent
Fulbright alumni